UN numbers from UN0201 to UN0300 as assigned by the United Nations Committee of Experts on the Transport of Dangerous Goods are as follows:


UN 0201 to UN 0300

See also
Lists of UN numbers

References

Lists of UN numbers